Bashigram Lake also known as Bashigram Danda in Pashto is an alpine glacial lake located to the eastern side of Madyan in Swat District of Khyber Pakhtunkhwa province of Pakistan.

See also

Lake Saiful Muluk - Kaghan Valley
Katora Lake - Kumrat Valley
Saidgai Lake - Swat Valley
Mahodand Lake - Kalam Valley
Kundol Lake - Kalam Valley
Daral Lake - Swat Valley

References

Tourist attractions in Swat
Lakes of Khyber Pakhtunkhwa
Swat District